The 2016–17 Sheffield Shield season was the 115th season of the Sheffield Shield, the domestic first-class cricket competition in Australia. It started on 25 October 2016 and finished on 30 March 2017. There was a break between December and January for the Big Bash League. The first round of matches were played as day/night games in preparation for Australia's day/night Test match against Pakistan on 15 December 2016. A second day/night round of fixtures took place in round five of the tournament.

Victoria qualified for the final after their 8 wicket win against Western Australia in round 9 of the competition. Victoria secured a home tie in the final, with an innings victory against Queensland in round 10. However, the Melbourne Cricket Ground was unavailable for the fixture, so it took place at Traeger Park in Alice Springs. They faced South Australia in the final, for the second consecutive year. Victoria won the competition with a first-innings lead in the final, after the match finished as a draw. It was their 31st tournament win and their third consecutive title.

Points table

Round-Robin stage

Round 1

Round 2

Round 3

Round 4

Round 5

Round 6

Round 7

Round 8

Round 9

Round 10

Final

Statistics

Most runs

Most wickets

References

External links
 2016–17 Sheffield Shield on ESPN Cricinfo

Sheffield Shield
Sheffield Shield
Sheffield Shield seasons